Milan Obrenović may refer to:

 Milan Obrenović II, Prince of Serbia (1819–1839)
 Milan Obrenović IV (1854–1901)
 Milan Obrenović (revolutionary) ( 1767–1810)